Kamalapur Mosque, also known as Masum Khan Mosque, is a square shaped three domed ancient mosque and archaeological site located in Barisal District of Bangladesh. It is located in the Kamalapur village under Gournadi Upazila. It was built in the Mughal architecture style.And it was built around 16th century.

History
According to local tradition, it was built by Masum Khan in 17th century. The mosque is a protected monument by Department of Archaeology since 1975.

Features
The walls of the mosque are 1.83 meters thick, 17.22 meters in length to the north–south and 8.08 meters to the east–west. It has five arched doorways, three on the east and one each on the north and south sides. The center arch on the east side is larger than the rest.

Gallery

See also
 List of archaeological sites in Bangladesh

References

External links
 

Mosques in Bangladesh
16th-century establishments in India
Barishal District
Archaeological sites in Barisal district